Roman Volodymyrovych Borysevych (born 20 June 1993) is a Ukrainian professional footballer who plays as a defensive midfielder for Ukrainian club Prykarpattia Ivano-Frankivsk.

References

External links
 Profile on Prykarpattia Ivano-Frankivsk official website
 
 

1993 births
Living people
People from Horodenka
Ukrainian footballers
Association football midfielders
FC Karpaty Yaremche players
FC Pokuttia Kolomyia players
FC Prykarpattia Ivano-Frankivsk (1998) players
Ukrainian First League players
Ukrainian Second League players
Sportspeople from Ivano-Frankivsk Oblast